A public company is a company whose ownership is organized via shares of stock which are intended to be freely traded on a stock exchange or in over-the-counter markets. A public (publicly traded) company can be listed on a stock exchange (listed company), which facilitates the trade of shares, or not (unlisted public company). In some jurisdictions, public companies over a certain size must be listed on an exchange. In most cases, public companies are private enterprises in the private sector, and "public" emphasizes their reporting and trading on the public markets.

Public companies are formed within the legal systems of particular states, and therefore have associations and formal designations which are distinct and separate in the polity in which they reside. In the United States, for example, a public company is usually a type of corporation (though a corporation need not be a public company), in the United Kingdom it is usually a public limited company (plc), in France a "société anonyme" (SA), and in Germany an Aktiengesellschaft (AG). While the general idea of a public company may be similar, differences are meaningful, and are at the core of international law disputes with regard to industry and trade.

Securities 
Usually, the securities of a publicly traded company are owned by many investors while the shares of a privately held company are owned by relatively few shareholders. A company with many shareholders is not necessarily a publicly traded company. In the United States, in some instances, companies with over 500 shareholders may be required to report under the Securities Exchange Act of 1934; companies that report under the 1934 Act are generally deemed public companies.

Advantages and disadvantages

Advantages 
Public companies possess some advantages over privately held businesses.

 Publicly traded companies are able to raise funds and capital through the sale (in the primary or secondary market) of shares of stock. This is the reason publicly traded corporations are important; prior to their existence, it was very difficult to obtain large amounts of capital for private enterprises, as significant capital could only come from a smaller set of wealthy investors or banks willing to risk typically large investments. The profit on stock is gained in form of dividend or capital gain to the holders.
 The financial media, analysts, and the public are able to access additional information about the business, since the business is commonly legally bound, and naturally motivated (so as to secure further capital), to publicly disseminate information regarding the financial status and future of the company to its many shareholders and the government.
 Because many people have a vested interest in the company's success, the company may be more popular or recognizable than a private company.
 The initial shareholders of the company are able to share risk by selling shares to the public. If one were to hold a 100% share of the company, they would have to pay all of the business's debt; however, if an individual were to hold a 50% share, they would only need to pay 50% of the debt. This increases asset liquidity and the company does not need to depend on funding from a bank. For example, in 2013 Facebook founder Mark Zuckerberg owned 29.3% of the company's class A shares, which gave him enough voting power to control the business, while allowing Facebook to raise capital from, and distribute risk to, the remaining shareholders. Facebook was a privately held company prior to its initial public offering in 2012.
 If some shares are given to managers or other employees, potential conflicts of interest between employees and shareholders (an instance of principal–agent problem) will be remitted. As an example, in many tech companies, entry-level software engineers are given stock in the company upon being hired (thus they become shareholders). Therefore, the engineers have a vested interest in the company succeeding financially, and are incentivized to work harder and more diligently to ensure that success.
 Public companies by their fiduciary duty are legally forbidden from taking an action that may decrease the stock price or failing to take any action that may increase it. Perpetual growth is the goal of every public company.

Disadvantages 
Many stock exchanges require that publicly traded companies have their accounts regularly audited by outside auditors, and then publish the accounts to their shareholders. Besides the cost, this may make useful information available to competitors. Various other annual and quarterly reports are also required by law. In the United States, the Sarbanes–Oxley Act imposes additional requirements. The requirement for audited books is not imposed by the exchange known as OTC Pink. The shares may be maliciously held by outside shareholders and the original founders or owners may lose benefits and control. The principal–agent problem, or the agency problem is a key weakness of public companies. The separation of a company's ownership and control is especially prevalent in such countries as the UK and the US.

Stockholders 
In the United States, the Securities and Exchange Commission requires that firms whose stock is traded publicly report their major shareholders each year. The reports identify all institutional shareholders (primarily, firms owning stock in other companies), all company officials who own shares in their firm, and any individual or institution owning more than 5% of the firm's stock.

General trend 
For many years, newly created companies were privately held but held initial public offering to become publicly traded company or to be acquired by another company if they became larger and more profitable or had promising prospects. More  infrequently, some companies—such as investment banking firm Goldman Sachs and logistics services provider United Parcel Service (UPS)—chose to remain privately held for a long period of time after maturity into a profitable company.

However, from 1997 to 2012, the number of corporations publicly traded on American stock exchanges dropped 45%. According to one observer (Gerald F. Davis), "public corporations have become less concentrated, less integrated, less interconnected at the top, shorter lived, less remunerative for average investors, and less prevalent since the turn of the 21st century". Davis argues that technological changes such as the decline in price and increasing power, quality and flexibility of computer numerical control machines and newer digitally enabled tools such as 3D printing will lead to smaller and more local organization of production.

Privatization 
In corporate privatization, more often called "going private", a group of private investors or another company that is privately held can buy out the shareholders of a public company, taking the company off the public markets. This is typically done through a leveraged buyout and occurs when the buyers believe the securities have been undervalued by investors. In some cases, public companies that are in severe financial distress may also approach a private company or companies to take over ownership and management of the company. One way of doing this would be to make a rights issue designed to enable the new investor to acquire a supermajority. With a super-majority, the company could then be relisted, i.e. privatized.

Alternatively, a publicly traded company may be purchased by one or more other publicly traded companies, with the target company becoming either a subsidiary or joint venture of the purchaser(s), or ceasing to exist as a separate entity, its former shareholders receiving compensation in the form of either cash, shares in the purchasing company or a combination of both. When the compensation is primarily shares then the deal is often considered a merger. Subsidiaries and joint ventures can also be created de novo—this often happens in the financial sector. Subsidiaries and joint ventures of publicly traded companies are not generally considered to be privately held companies (even though they themselves are not publicly traded) and are generally subject to the same reporting requirements as publicly traded companies. Finally, shares in subsidiaries and joint ventures can be (re)-offered to the public at any time—firms that are sold in this manner are called spin-outs.

Most industrialized jurisdictions have enacted laws and regulations that detail the steps that prospective owners (public or private) must undertake if they wish to take over a publicly traded corporation. This often entails the would-be buyer(s) making a formal offer for each share of the company to shareholders.

Trading and valuation 
The shares of a publicly traded company are often traded on a stock exchange. The value or "size" of a company is called its market capitalization, a term which is often shortened to "market cap". This is calculated as the number of shares outstanding (as opposed to authorized but not necessarily issued) times the price per share. For example, a company with two million shares outstanding and a price per share of US$40 has a market capitalization of US$80 million. However, a company's market capitalization should not be confused with the fair market value of the company as a whole since the price per share are influenced by other factors such as the volume of shares traded.  Low trading volume can cause artificially low prices for securities, due to investors being apprehensive of investing in a company they perceive as possibly lacking liquidity.

For example, if all shareholders were to simultaneously try to sell their shares in the open market, this would immediately create downward pressure on the price for which the share is traded unless there were an equal number of buyers willing to purchase the security at the price the sellers demand. So, sellers would have to either reduce their price or choose not to sell. Thus, the number of trades in a given period of time, commonly referred to as the "volume" is important when determining how well a company's market capitalization reflects true fair market value of the company as a whole. The higher the volume, the more the fair market value of the company is likely to be reflected by its market capitalization.

Another example of the impact of volume on the accuracy of market capitalization is when a company has little or no trading activity and the market price is simply the price at which the most recent trade took place, which could be days or weeks ago. This occurs when there are no buyers willing to purchase the securities at the price being offered by the sellers and there are no sellers willing to sell at the price the buyers are willing to pay. While this is rare when the company is traded on a major stock exchange, it is not uncommon when shares are traded over-the-counter (OTC). Since individual buyers and sellers need to incorporate news about the company into their purchasing decisions, a security with an imbalance of buyers or sellers may not feel the full effect of recent news.

See also 

 Forbes Global 2000
 Government agency
 Non-departmental public body
 plc, public company under UK legislation
 Public bodies
 Publicly unlisted company
 Regulatory agency
 Statutory authority
 Statutory corporation
 Success trap
 UK company law

Notes

References 

 
Types of business entity